This is a list of members of the Parliament of the French Community during the 2009–2014 legislative session, arranged alphabetically.

Composition

Current members
← denotes replaced member serving as federal/regional/community minister or federal representative, or German-speaking member of Walloon Parliament

Members of the Walloon Parliament (75)

Members of the Parliament of the Brussels-Capital Region (19)

Notes

Sources
 
 

Fren
2009 in Belgium
2010s in Belgium